"Euphoria" is a song performed by Swedish recording artist and songwriter Loreen. It was released on 26 February 2012 as the third single from her debut studio album Heal (2012). The song was written by Thomas G:son, Peter Boström and produced by Boström and SeventyEight. It is best known as Sweden's winning entry at the Eurovision Song Contest 2012 held in Baku, Azerbaijan. The song won the competition with a total of 372 points, at the time the second-highest point total in the contest's history. The song received the highest number of maximum (12) points of any entry in the contest's history with eighteen countries giving the song their top marks.

"Euphoria" received critical acclaim from most music critics. Commercially, the song was an instant success both in Sweden and in the rest of Europe. It debuted at number twelve in Loreen's home country Sweden, before reaching number one, staying there for six weeks. The song has been certified 10 times Platinum, selling 400,000 copies there. Outside of Sweden, the song peaked at number one in 16 countries across Europe, the most chart-topping positions of any Eurovision winner. The song topped the Euro Digital Songs chart weeks after the competition.

Background
The song was written by Thomas G:son, Peter Boström and produced by Boström and SeventyEight.

Critical reception
Prior to the song contest, it was ranked highly on many prediction polls to win most notably by the OGAE members. The song also received critical acclaim. SameSame praised the song "The heavy bangs, the steely gaze, and that icy-yet-pleading vocal performance in 'Euphoria' all set the tone for what was to complete my Loreen experience." Higher Plain Music wrote "the most straightforward dance track on the album and is still a killer track."
Music journalist Deban Aderemi of wiwibloggs noted that'..Loreen's performance transcends borders. It is conceptual, yet so relatable. "Euphoria" provides the perfect template for a thousand remixes. Aderemi then goes on to award Loreen a score of 9/10. EscXtra considered that the string intro from the album version was the best part of the song while calling the song "brilliant." Erika Brooks Adickman from Idolator had described the song as "infectious". The Reflective Inklings had labelled the song as "Song of the Week". They gave it an extended review saying:

Euphoria is undoubtedly the best song of the pack that I have heard so far. It has Swedish elements sprinkled all over it. It is delicately done. The synths offer that aesthetic gloss that only makes the track go higher in terms of approval ratings. Upbeat would be a good way of describing Euphoria. Just like its predecessor (Popular), it can evoke feelings of great positivity onto its listener. Loreen shows tremendous composure in delivering those high notes. Hearing Loreen start slowly in terms of building that excitement in terms of her soon-to-be-sang high notes really got me pumped up.

On 26 May, just before the finals began, it received two Marcel Bezençon Awards: the Artistic Award presented to the best artist as voted on by the commentators, and the Composer Award for the best and most original composition as voted on by the participating composers (Thomas G:son and Peter Boström).

In 2019, Theresa Ziegler, editor-in-chief of The Gap, Austria's longest-standing pop culture magazine, wrote that "Euphoria" was the best pop song of the decade.

Chart performance
Commercially, the song was a success, not only in European markets, but also in the Australian market. In her native Sweden, the song debuted at number twelve on the Swedish Singles Chart. The song then rose to number one, where it stayed for six consecutive weeks. The song has been certified 9× platinum by GLF, selling more than 360,000 units in that country. In Finland, the song debuted at number one, and returned to number one after twelve weeks in the charts. The song debuted and spent a week at number one on the Danish Singles Chart. The song peaked at the top spot in several countries including Austria, Germany, Iceland, Greece and Switzerland. The song has also reached the top-ten in the Media Forest airplay charts from Israel, Moldova and Romania, peaking at number-two, three and seven respectively.

The song debuted at number eighty-five on the UK Singles Chart, where it climbed to number three the following week; this is the highest chart position for a non-UK Eurovision entry since Johnny Logan's "Hold Me Now" in 1987. The single sold 62,148 copies in its first week in the United Kingdom. It has spent 15 consecutive weeks in the UK Top 100, and is the most downloaded Eurovision single in UK history, ahead of "Waterloo" by Sweden's ABBA and "I Can" by the United Kingdom's Blue The single has sold 500,000 copies in Germany and 2 million copies worldwide. In Australia, the song had its official debut at number thirty-six. The song also debuted at number four on the Australian Dance Charts.

Eurovision Song Contest
Loreen entered the song at the Melodifestivalen 2012 at the Vida Arena in Växjö where she performed it during the first round of the competition. She automatically advanced to the final after it was among the top 2 song entries that received the highest votes. On 10 March, during the final at the Globen Arena in Stockholm, she performed the song once more while being judged by 11 international juries and voted by the Swedish people's televote. These were then combined for a final result. She eventually finished in 1st place and won the right to represent Sweden at the Eurovision Song Contest 2012 after receiving the highest points from both the international juries and the televoting, with a grand total of 268 points. It was reported that a record figure of more than 670,000 of the four million viewers called in to vote for her song.

Sweden was drawn to compete 11th in the second semi-final on 24 May. The song eventually advanced to the Grand Final and was drawn to perform 17th in the line-up. At the Grand Final, held on 26 May, the song eventually placed first with a total of 372 points, just fifteen points shy of the (then) all-time record of 387, which is held by 2009 winner Alexander Rybak with the song "Fairytale". Additionally, it broke the record for having received the most 12 points awarded by 18 other participating countries under the current voting rules of the Eurovision Song Contest. In total, Sweden received points from 40 of the voting 42 countries excluding itself. The only country that did not award any points was Italy. Both her Melodifestivalen and her Eurovision performances were directed by Swedish choreographer Ambra Succi.

Music video
TV music channels initially used the Melodifestivalen 2012 performance as the official music video. Loreen later confirmed the release of an official music video. Loreen tweeted pictures from the set of the music video which was filmed on 13 June 2012. The video premiered on 5 July on Warner Music Sweden's YouTube channel. The video, filmed in a field on the outskirts of Stockholm, features Loreen dancing in a field of tall grass and eventually snow. The snow was emulated for the final performance at Eurovision.

Track listing
CD single
 "Euphoria" (Single version) – 3:00
 "Euphoria" (Carli Remix version) – 5:44
 "Euphoria" (Alex Moreno Remix version) – 6:39
 "Euphoria" (Carli Dub version) – 5:44
 "Euphoria" (Alex Moreno Remix radio edit) – 3:23
 "Euphoria" (Carli Remix radio edit) – 3:50
 "Euphoria" (Instrumental version) – 3:00

Digital download
 "Euphoria" (Single version) – 3:01
 "Euphoria" (Karaoke version) – 3:01
 "Euphoria" (Instrumental) – 2:59

Digital EP – Remixes
 "Euphoria" (Carli Remix version) – 5:43
 "Euphoria" (Alex Moreno Remix version) – 6:39
 "Euphoria" (Alex Moreno Remix radio edit) – 3:24
 "Euphoria" (Single version) – 3:01

Official promo remixes
 "Euphoria (Robin Rocks & Rubio Remix) – 6:03
 "Euphoria (Lucas Nord Remix) – 6:01
 "Euphoria (Lucas Nord Remix Radio Edit) – 3:49
 "Euphoria (Robin Rocks & Rubio Remix) [Radio Edit] – 3:47
 "Euphoria (Drumapella) – 3:01
 "Euphoria (Strings Version) – 3:00
 "Euphoria (Alex Moreno Remix Radio Edit) – 3:25
 "Euphoria (Alex Moreno Remix) – 6:40
 "Euphoria (Martin Wik Remix) – 3:20
 "Euphoria (Carli Radio Remix) – 3:16
 "Euphoria (Carli Remix) – 5:40
 "Euphoria (Tiger & Wolf Remix) – 6:43
 "Euphoria (Stormby Radio Mix) – 3:06
 "Euphoria (Stormby Extended Mix) – 5:49
 "Euphoria (WaWa Radio Edit) – 3:13
 "Euphoria (Acoustic Strings Version) – 4:39
 "Euphoria (Acoustic Guitar Version) – 3:43
 "Euphoria (WaWa Club Mix) – 6:07
 "Euphoria (7th Heaven Club Mix) – 8:41
 "Euphoria (Instrumental) – 3:04
 "Euphoria (DJ Solovey Remix) – 5:32
 "Euphoria (Acapella Filtered) – 3:01

Charts and certifications

Weekly charts

Year-end charts

Certifications

Release history

Sverrir Bergmann and Halldór Gunnar's version

The Icelandic artists Sverrir Bergmann & Halldór Gunnar recorded a cover of the song in their album of covers titled Föstudagslögin. Their version done as a pop ballad became, in July 2012, a success in Iceland simultaneously with the hit by Loreen herself. Both versions appeared on Tónlist, the official Icelandic Singles Chart simultaneously.

Chart history 
Sverrir Bergmann & Halldór Gunnar version entered the Icelandic singles chart 27/2012 at #16, rising to #5 in chart 28/2012.

Helen Sjöholm's version
Swedish singer Helen Sjöholm covered the song during the 11th season of the TV4 show Så mycket bättre, a show in which different Swedish artists live together in a house for a few days and cover each other songs. Helen's version, named Euforia, was the closing song for the show and it featured whole new lyrics in Swedish that were written by singer Tomas Andersson Wij. Its episode premiered on the 19th of December 2020. This version lasts 3:35 minutes.

Other covers
Singer Gavin Mikhail recorded a version for his album "Some Die Young".
Bengt Hennings recorded the song on their 2012 studio album Scenen är vår.
On 27 May 2012, the song was performed live by the Swedish Royal Guards of the Stockholm Castle. During the Melodifestivalen 2013 finals, the song was performed by Adolf Fredrik's Music School with sign language interpretation from the Manilla School, that version was later released for digital download.
 Swedish Power Metal band ReinXeed released a cover on their second compilation entitled 'Swedish Hitz Goes Metal Vol II'.
 Australian singer Greg Gould released an acoustic version on his EP 'Don't Let Go' on 10 February 2017 which debuted on the Australian iTunes Charts at #16. The music video features true love stories from the LGBTQI community.
 German singer Nicole, winner of the Eurovision Song Contest 1982, recorded a German version on her 2017 album 12 Punkte.
 On 13 November 2017, Thalia and Miriam performed the song on Gala 3 of season nine of Spanish reality television talent competition Operación Triunfo.
 On 8 May 2021, Floor Jansen performed a heavier rendition of the song at Beste Zangers Songfestival special, on Dutch television.
 The song was covered in season 2, episode 6 of Pørni, a Norwegian series starring Henriette Steenstrup, by a band consisting of a vocalist (with banjo), an accordion and a drum.

References

External links
 Loreen - Euphoria (Official Audio) at YouTube

2010s ballads
2012 singles
Eurovision songs of 2012
Eurovision songs of Sweden
Irish Singles Chart number-one singles
Loreen (singer) songs
Eurodance songs
Melodifestivalen songs of 2012
Eurovision Song Contest winning songs
Number-one singles in Austria
Number-one singles in Denmark
Number-one singles in Finland
Number-one singles in Germany
Number-one singles in Greece
Number-one singles in Iceland
Number-one singles in Norway
Number-one singles in Sweden
Number-one singles in Switzerland
Ultratop 50 Singles (Flanders) number-one singles
Songs written by Peter Boström
Songs written by Thomas G:son
Number-one singles in Poland
Bengt Hennings songs
Articles containing video clips
2012 songs
Song recordings produced by Jack & Coke
Warner Music Group singles